The Dellbridge Islands are a group of four islands in the Antarctic, just south of Cape Evans and Ross Island.

They are individually called Inaccessible Island, Tent Island, Big Razorback Island, and Little Razorback Island.  They are named after James H Dellbridge who was Second Engineer on the Discovery Expedition 1900 - 1904, led by Robert Falcon Scott.

See also
 Composite Antarctic Gazetteer
 List of Antarctic and sub-Antarctic islands
 List of Antarctic islands south of 60° S
 SCAR
 Territorial claims in Antarctica

References

 Dellbridge Islands from the Geographic Names Information System of the United States Geological Survey

External links 

Ross Archipelago